Mount Zeehan is a mountain in Western Tasmania, west of the West Coast Range. The closest town is Zeehan, about 4.93 kilometres (3 mi) away.

History
The indigenous Peerapper name for the mountain is recorded as Weiawenena.

European naming
On 24 November 1642, Dutch explorer Abel Tasman became the first European explorer to sight and document the Heemskirk and West Coast Range. Tasman sailed his ships close to the coastal area which today encompasses the Southwest Conservation Area, south of Macquarie Harbour, but was unable to send a landing party ashore due to poor weather and did not make contact with any South West Tasmanian groups. In their circumnavigation of Tasmania between 1798–99, George Bass and Matthew Flinders named the Heemskirk Range mountains Mount Heemskirk and Mount Zeehan after Tasman’s ships, the warship Heemskerck (Old Dutch for "Home Church") and the 200 tone fluyt Zeehaen (Old Dutch for "Sea Rooster") in honour of Tasman's voyage of exploration. Although Dutch in origin, Bass and Flinder's Anglicised naming of Mount Heemskirk and Mount Zeehan created some of the oldest British place names in Tasmania. Only a few Dutch place names in Tasmania originate from Tasman's 1642 voyage. Most place names were not assigned in Van Diemen's Land until after the settlement of Hobart Town at Risdon Cove in 1803, although some place names originate from Bruni d'Entrecasteaux's French expedition in 1792. It was not until after the 1815 discovery of Macquarie Harbour by explorer and mariner James Kelly that many place names on the West Coast were assigned.

Mining
Silver-lead deposits were discovered at Mount Zeehan by Frank Long in 1882. The Zeehan mineral field contains more than 100 legacy mine sites, many of which are affected by acid mine drainage, costing an estimated A$100,000 per hectare to purify.

Township of Zeehan

Mount Zeehan Post Office opened on 1 August 1888. The township was named Zeehan in 1890.

Tourism
Constructed as part of silver-mining operations in 1904, a 100 metre long railway tunnel leading to the former Spray Silver Mine has become a popular walking destination with tourists. The Spray Tunnel was closed in January 2022 after cracks were discovered in the ceiling.

A three-hour return walk to the summit of Mount Zeehan is accessible via a 4WD track.

References

Zeehan
Zeehan